USS Cincinnati (LCS-20) is an  of the United States Navy. She is the fifth ship to be named after Cincinnati, Ohio.

Design
In 2002, the United States Navy initiated a program to develop the first of a fleet of littoral combat ships. The Navy initially ordered two trimaran hulled ships from General Dynamics, which became known as the  after the first ship of the class, . Even-numbered U.S. Navy littoral combat ships are built using the Independence-class trimaran design, while odd-numbered ships are based on a competing design, the conventional monohull . The initial order of littoral combat ships involved a total of four ships, including two of the Independence-class design. On 29 December 2010, the Navy announced that it was awarding Austal USA a contract to build ten additional Independence-class littoral combat ships.

Construction and career 
Cincinnati was christened on 7 May 2018 by former Secretary of Commerce Penny Pritzker and commissioned on 5 October 2019. She has been assigned to Littoral Combat Ship Squadron One.

References

 

Independence-class littoral combat ships
2018 ships